Olav Søfteland (born 8 November 1937) is a Norwegian civil servant.

Hailing from Søfteland in Os, he is a siv.ing. from the Norwegian Institute of Technology by education. In 1960 he was hired in the Norwegian Directorate of Public Roads, and was eventually promoted to director in 1992. Scheduled to retire as a pensioner in late 2007, he was forced to resign some months early due to the December 2006 Hanekleiv Tunnel scandal.

References

1937 births
Living people
Norwegian engineers
Norwegian civil servants
Directors of government agencies of Norway
Norwegian Institute of Technology alumni
Directorate of Public Roads people